Paul McKay (born 19 November 1996) is a Scottish professional footballer who plays as either a centre back for Queen of the South. McKay has previously played for Doncaster Rovers, Leeds United, Cardiff City and Airdrieonians. McKay has also had loan spells with Ilkeston, Gainsborough Trinity and 
Morecambe.

McKay was born in Glasgow and played youth football with the Doncaster Rovers Academy as well as studying  at Hill House School, before starting his professional career with the club.

Club career

Doncaster Rovers
On 1 September 2015, McKay made his professional debut for Doncaster Rovers in a first round win in the Football League Trophy versus Burton Albion. McKay started the match that the club won 5–3 on penalties after a goalless draw.

Ilkeston FC (loan)
In October 2015, McKay and his twin brother Jack went out on loan to Ilkeston to gain first-team experience.

Leeds United
On 11 January 2016, McKay and his brother Jack both signed for Leeds United for undisclosed fees on two-and-a-half year contracts under then head coach Steve Evans.

During the pre-season of the 2016-17, McKay was involved in the first-team squad, playing regularly in pre-season due to the departure of centre-back Giuseppe Bellusci and the injury to Liam Cooper.

On 29 January 2017, McKay made his Leeds debut versus Sutton United in the FA Cup.

On 17 December 2017, McKay and his brother Jack ended their contracts by mutual consent.

Cardiff City
On 22 January 2018, McKay signed for Cardiff City on a two and a half year contract after an extended trial with the club.

In January 2019, McKay was loaned out to League Two club Morecambe for the remainder of the 2018-19 season.

Airdrieonians
In July 2019, McKay signed for Scottish League One club Airdrieonians. where he primarily played as a midfielder until his departure on 31 May 2021.

Queen of the South
On 9 June 2021, McKay signed a one-year deal with Scottish Championship club Queen of the South.

On 23 February 2022, McKay extended his deal to remain at the Doonhamers for another two seasons until the summer of 2024. 

On 27 August 2022, McKay was sent-off for violent conduct in the 84th minute, in a 3-1 defeat away to Falkirk in Scottish League One.

Personal life
McKay's father Willie McKay and his older brother Mark are both football agents. His twin brother, Jack McKay is also a professional footballer.

Career statistics

References

External links

1996 births
Living people
Association football forwards
Footballers from Glasgow
Scottish footballers
English Football League players
Doncaster Rovers F.C. players
Northern Premier League players
Ilkeston F.C. players
Leeds United F.C. players
Twin sportspeople
Cardiff City F.C. players
Morecambe F.C. players
Airdrieonians F.C. players
Queen of the South F.C. players
Scottish Professional Football League players
Anglo-Scots
Scottish twins